Paul C. Bressloff is an English American biophysicist and mathematical neuroscientist. As of 2022, Bressloff is currently a full professor in the Department of Mathematics at the University of Utah.

Education 
Bressloff obtained an MA with First Class Honors from the University of Oxford in 1982, and obtained his Ph.D from the Department of Mathematics at King's College in 1988. His thesis was titled Quantum field theory of superstrings in the light-cone gauge.

Research 
Bressloff has published extensively on a wide variety of applied and theoretical topics. As of 2022, he has an H-index of 54, and he has published over three-hundred and fifty articles, three textbooks, and has co-written a non-fiction popular science book. He has advised more than twenty PhD recipients.

Books 
Paul is the author of three textbooks in computational biology, two of which deal with stochastic processes in cellular biology.

 Bursting: The Genesis of Rhythm in the Nervous System with Stephen Coombes (2003)
 Waves in Neural Media: From Single Neurons to Neural Fields (2013)
 Stochastic Processes in Cell Biology (2014)
 Stochastic Processes in Cell Biology: Volume II (2022)

References

External links

British mathematicians
British physicists
British biophysicists
Computational biologists
British neuroscientists
Computational neuroscience
University of Utah faculty
University of Utah people
University of Utah staff
Alumni of King's College London
Alumni of the University of Oxford
Living people
Year of birth missing (living people)